Rafael Nieto may refer to:

 Rafael Nieto (politician) (1884–1926), Mexican politician, early 20th century, see Governor of San Luis Potosí
 Rafael Nieto Abeillé (d. 1916), Cuban judge and Puerto Rican Attorney General
 Rafael Nieto Loaiza (b. 1966), Colombian jurist, political analyst
 Rafael Nieto Navia (b. 1938), Colombian jurist, judge, ambassador